Manohar Lal Sharma is an Indian lawyer known for filing a number of frivolous public interest litigations.

Career
Starting with a public interest litigation in 1991 against provisions of the Places of Worship Act, 1991, Sharma has litigated a number of issues in Indian courts that have attracted media attention.

He had filed a petition before the Supreme Court about the Indian coal allocation scam. He also defended the accused in the 2012 Delhi gang rape case. In 2007, as an independent advocate, he filed a public interest litigation petition in the Supreme Court in the case of Sant Muktabai Sahakari Sakhar Karkhana.

Controversies

Blaming the Nirbhaya Case victims for using public transport and lack of character 
In defense of the accused in the 2012 Delhi gang rape and murder case, Sharma blamed the victim for using public transportation. He said, “Until today I have not seen a single incident or example of rape with a respected lady. Even an underworld don would not like to touch a girl with respect."

Sharma claimed, ‘Nirbhaya gang rape was planned by her boyfriend to gain political mileage’

Publicity on burning issues in court 
Sharma is known among lawyers for being the first to approach the court on any burning issue. His petitions are always poorly drafted and lack substance or legal backing. By virtue of being the first to file a petition in court, he makes his way to daily headlines and fame.

Contempt notice over false averments 
On 18 November 2022, Supreme Court of India issued contempt notice to Sharma for allegedly attributing motives to Madhya Pradesh High Court Chief Justice Ravi Malimath in their petition challenging the High Court verdict.

References

20th-century Indian lawyers
1950s births
Living people
Year of birth uncertain